Herman Nikièma (born 30 November 1988) is a Burkinabé international footballer who plays for US Ouagadougou, as a left back.

Career
Born in Ouagadougou, he has played club football for US Ouagadougou.

He made his international debut for Burkina Faso in 2017.

International goals
Scores and results list Burkina Faso's goal tally first.

References

1988 births
Living people
Burkinabé footballers
Burkina Faso international footballers
US Ouagadougou players
Association football fullbacks
21st-century Burkinabé people